The School of Architecture (SOA)  is part of the College of Fine Arts at University of Nevada, Las Vegas. It is accredited by the National Architectural Accrediting Board (NAAB) in October 1997 and currently provides the only program accredited for architecture in the state of Nevada. The school offers a Bachelor of Science in architecture, interior architecture and landscape architecture. It also offers a master of architecture as a professional degree and a master of healthcare interior design.

Buildings 

The School of Architecture is located in the Paul B. Sogg Architecture Building located on the Southeast corner of UNLV's campus on Brussels Road close to Maryland Pkwy and Tropicana Ave in Las Vegas, Nevada. The  facility was named after the developer Paul B. Sogg who donated generously for the building's construction. The cost of the building was $8.25 million and was designed by SH Architecture (formerly Swisher & Hall, AIA Ltd.) of Las Vegas. Facilities inside the structure include the Architecture Studies Library providing a wide selection of services catered to students within the School of Architecture, as well providing services to the architectural community throughout Las Vegas. An addition to the original structure was completed in 2004 to provide more studio space and offices. This new addition was designed by DPHS Architects and cost $1.6 million.

In the fall of 2008, the Downtown Design Center opened in the historic Fifth Street School, a former primary school listed on the National Register of Historic Places on Clark Avenue and Las Vegas Boulevard (previously 5th Street) in downtown Las Vegas. The Downtown Design Center hosts specialized studios, the Klai Juba Wald lecture series, and is home to the state and local chapter of the American Institute of Architects.

References

External links
 

School of Architecture